Bustin' Loose is a soundtrack album released by Roberta Flack in 1981. It was recorded for the movie of the same title starring Richard Pryor.  Luther Vandross and Peabo Bryson contributed vocals to the album and Vandross wrote the song, "You Stopped Loving Me", which he later performed himself on his debut album Never Too Much.

Track listing                                                                                        
"Lovin' You (Is Such an Easy Thang to Do)"                                [5:57]
"Rollin' On"                                                              [4:17]
"You Stopped Loving Me"                                                   [4:32]
"Just When I Needed You" (Eric Mercury, Roberta Flack)                [4:48]
"Qual E Malindrinho (Why Are You So Bad)"                                 [4:47]
"Love Always Commands"                                                    [6:27]
"Children's Song"                                                         [4:40]
"Ballad for D"                                                            [3:35]
"Hittin' Me Where It Hurts"                                               [3:43]

Personnel
Roberta Flack - vocals,  piano 
Peabo Bryson - backing vocals
Barry Miles - keyboards, arrangements 
Marcus Miller - bass
Dom Um Romão - percussion
Luther Vandross - backing vocals 
Georg Wadenius - guitar 
Buddy Williams - drums 

Roberta Flack albums
1981 soundtrack albums
Film soundtracks
MCA Records soundtracks